Wings of China is the inflight magazine of Air China. The magazine is published monthly in Beijing, China.

History and profile
The magazine was started in 1992 with the name Wings. Ten years later, in 2002, the magazine was renamed Wings of China. The magazine was published by Air China Media Ltd. on a monthly basis and is based in Beijing. It covers articles in English and in Chinese. Then it began to be published by Cinmedia again on a monthly basis.

Between 2007 and 2009 the magazine was on the list of 100 top valuable magazines by advertising circulation by China Advertising Association.

Accusations of racism
Wings of China faced accusations of racism when they stated "London is generally a safe place to travel, however precautions are needed when entering areas mainly populated by Indians, Pakistanis and black people in their September 2016 issue because people felt uncomfortable due to the statement, which meant that travelers must take precautions or avoid multiracial areas. Following the event the parent company of the magazine, Air China, issued an apology.

References

	

1992 establishments in China
Air China
Chinese-language magazines
English-language magazines
Inflight magazines
Magazines established in 1992
Magazines published in Beijing
Monthly magazines published in China
Tourism magazines